Kirtlington Quarry is a  geological Site of Special Scientific Interest west of Kirtlington in Oxfordshire. It is a Geological Conservation Review site, and it is part of the  Kirtlington Quarry Local Nature Reserve.

Kirtlington Quarry is one of the most important Middle Jurassic vertebrate localities in the world. It dates to the Upper Bathonian, around 166 million years ago, and is part of the Forest Marble Formation. Numerous species of extinct mammal have been found. There are also fossils of  theropod dinosaurs, crocodilians, pterosaurs, fishes and many shark teeth.

References

Local nature reserves in Oxfordshire
Sites of Special Scientific Interest in Oxfordshire
Geological Conservation Review sites